The Virginia Tech Richmond Center in the Richmond Region is responsible for carrying out the university's three missions – research, education, and outreach. The Richmond Center's presence was established in 2001 and has since created facilities, appointed faculty, graduate degrees, and research in the Richmond area. The Richmond Center offers a wide range of graduate programs, workshops, and customized educational programs.

Graduate degrees and certificate programs

The Virginia Tech Richmond Center offers graduate degrees and certificate programs taught by internationally recognized faculty. It is located is in the West End of Richmond.

Professional Development
The Virginia Tech Richmond Center offers a series of professional development workshops. The center has a number of partnerships with the public and private sectors to enhance employee learning, discovery and engagement. Each course can be customized to effectively meet the needs of the organization or student.

Alumni
Approximately 15,000 alumni live within the Richmond Region.

See also
Virginia Polytechnic Institute and State University
Campus of Virginia Tech

References

External links 
 VT Richmond Center Website

Virginia Tech

Virginia Tech
Educational institutions established in 2001
2001 establishments in Virginia